Yeongjo of Joseon (31 October 1694 – 22 April 1776), personal name Yi Geum (Korean: 이금, Hanja: 李昑), was the 21st monarch of the Joseon dynasty of Korea. He was the second son of King Sukjong, by his concubine Royal Noble Consort Suk of the Haeju Choe clan. Before ascending to power, he was known as Prince Yeoning (Korean: 연잉군, Hanja: 延礽君). His life was characterized by political infighting and resentment due to his biological mother's low-born origins.

In 1720, a few months after the accession of his older half-brother, Yi Yun (posthumously called King Gyeongjong), as the 20th King, Yeoning became the Crown Prince. This induced a large controversy between the political factions. Nevertheless, four years later, at the death of Gyeongjong, he ascended to the throne.

Yeongjo's reign lasted nearly 52 years and was marked by his persistent efforts to reform the taxation system and minimize and reconcile the factional fighting under his Tangpyeong policy ("Magnificent Harmony"; 蕩平, 탕평). His reign was also marked by the highly controversial execution of his only son, Crown Prince Sado, in 1762. In spite of this controversy, Yeongjo's reign has earned a positive reputation in Korean history due to his sincere efforts to rule by Confucian ethics.

Biography

Succession to the throne
In 1720, King Sukjong died and Crown Prince Yi Yun, Sukjong's eldest son, ascended to the throne as King Gyeongjong, at the age of 33. Before he died in 1720, Sukjong supposedly told Yi I-myeong to name Prince Yeoning as Gyeongjong's heir, but in the absence of a historiographer or scribe, no record exists. At this time, the Noron faction unsuccessfully tried to pressure the new king to step down in favor of his younger half-brother.

A few months after the Gyeongjong's enthronement, Prince Yeoning was installed as Crown Prince Brother (Wangseje; 왕세제, 王世弟). This aggravated the power struggle and led to a great massacre, namely the Shinim literati purge (신임사화, 辛壬士禍). The Noron sent petitions to the king to no effect while the opposing Soron faction used this to their advantage — claiming the Noron were trying to usurp power and subsequently getting their rival faction removed from several offices.

Members of the Soron faction then came up with a plan to assassinate Yeoning under the pretence of hunting for a white fox said to be haunting the palace, but he sought shelter with his adoptive mother, Queen Dowager Hyesun. Afterwards, he told the king that he would rather go and live as a commoner.

On 11 October 1724, King Gyeongjong died. The Soron accused Yeoning of being involved in his brother's death due to the earlier attempt of the Noron faction to have him placed on the throne. Many historians, however, now believe that he could have died from food poisoning caused by contaminated seafood, as he displayed symptoms of the illness. Homer Hulbert described this in his book The History of Korea, where he said, "But we may well doubt the truth of the rumor, for nothing that is told of that brother indicates that he would commit such an act, and in the second place a man who will eat shrimps in mid-summer, that have been brought 30 miles from the sea without ice might expect to die". On 16 October 1724, Prince Yeoning ascended the throne as King Yeongjo, the 21st ruler of Joseon.

Reign
He was a deeply Confucian monarch, and is said to have had a greater knowledge of the classics than his officials. During the reigns of Yeongjo and his grandson Jeongjo, Confucianization was at its height, as well as the economic recovery from the wars of the late 16th and early 17th centuries. His rulership has been called one of the most brilliant reigns in Joseon's history.

Yeongjo worried deeply for his people. The Annals of the Joseon dynasty record that one day in the 4th year of his reign, King Yeongjo woke up to the sound of early morning rain and said to his courtiers:

Oh dear! We have had flood, drought and famines for the past four years because of my lack of virtue, and this year we even went through an unprecedented revolt by a traitor named Yi In-jwa. How can my poor people manage their livelihood under such hardship? There is an old saying, 'War is always followed by a lean year'. Fortunately, however, we haven’t had a big famine for the past two years and we pin our hopes on a good harvest this year. Yet I am still nervous because, while the season for harvesting is around the corner, there is no way of knowing if there will be a flood or drought before then. Nobody knows whether a cold rain will pour suddenly and flood the fields awaiting harvest. My lack of goodness might bring upon us such awful things as I fail to win the sympathy of heaven. How can I earn the sympathy of heavens if I do not self-reflect and make efforts myself? I should start with reflecting on myself.

As he worried that rain would ruin the harvest and force his unfortunate people to starve, the king ordered his courtiers to reduce the taxes and decrease the number of dishes in his own meals.

One early morning 25 years later (1753), the continuous rain reminded Yeongjo of the flood during the 4th year of his reign, when he had eaten less food:

Oh! Floods and droughts really happen because I lack virtue. I am much older than that year, but how can my compassion for the people and will to work hard for them be less than back then?".

Yet again, he ordered a reduction in the number of dishes on his dining table.

People around him described him as an articulate, bright, benevolent and kind monarch. He was penetrating in observation and quick of comprehension.

Policies
Realising the detrimental effect on state administration of the factional strife, Yeongjo attempted to end it as soon as he ascended the throne. He reinstated the short-lived universal military service tax, and then went beyond the palace gates to solicit the opinions of officials, literati (scholars), soldiers and peasants. Yeongjo reduced the military service tax by half and ordered the variance be supplemented by taxes on fisheries, salt, vessels and an additional land tax. He also regularized the financial system of state revenues and expenses by adopting an accounting system. His realistic policies allowed payment of taxes on grain from the remote mountainous areas Gyeongsang Province, to the nearby port, with payment in cotton or cash for grain. The circulation of currency was encouraged by increasing coin casting.

Yeongjo's concern for improvement of the peasant's life was manifest in his eagerness to educate the people by distributing important books in the Korean script (Hangul), including the Book of Agriculture.

The pluviometer was again manufactured in quantity and distributed to local administration offices and extensive public work projects were undertaken. Yeongjo upgraded the status of posterity of the commoners, opening another possibility for upward social mobility and inevitable change. His policies were intended to reassert the Confucian monarchy and a humanistic rule, but they were unable to stem the tide of social change that resulted.

Mercantile activities rapidly increased in volume. The accumulation of capital through monopoly and wholesales expanded through guild organisations and many merchants were centred in Hanseong. The traditional division of government chartered shop, the license tribute goods suppliers and the small shopkeepers in the alley and streets were integrated and woven into a monopoly and wholesale system.

Regardless of status, many yangban aristocrats and commoners engaged in some kind of merchant activities. Thus Hanseong made great strides as a commercial and industrial city in the 18th century. The popular demand for handicrafts and goods such as knives, horse hair hats, dining tables and brassware was ever-increasing. Restrictions on wearing the horse hair hat originally denoting yangban status, virtually disappeared.

Even bootlegging of books became commercialised as competition developed among the well-to-do yangban who engaged in the publication of collected literary works by their renowned ancestors. This also led to printing popular fiction and poetry. The people especially appreciated satire and social criticism. One example is the Chunhyangjeon (Tales of Chunghyang) about the fidelity of the gisaeng's daughter, which was widely read as a satire aimed to expose the greed and snobbery of government officials.

Anti-corruption
The King is also renowned for having treasured Park Mun-su, whom he appointed as secret royal inspector (Amhaengeosa; 암행어사). Park, who had earned great merit in putting down Yi In-jwa's rebellion in 1728, went around the nation arresting corrupt local officers in the name of the King.

Controversy
The only significantly dismal incident during Yeongjo's reign was the death of his son, Crown Prince Sado. History indicates Sado suffered from mental illness; randomly killing people in the palace and raping palace maids. Because Yeongjo could not execute his son without also implicating his daughter-in-law and beloved grandson, he ordered the Sado to climb into a wooden rice chest on a hot July day in 1762. After eight days, Sado died. During the 19th century, there were rumors that Crown Prince Sado had not been mentally ill, but had been victimised by a court plot; however, this is contradicted by both the memoirs written by Sado's widow and the Annals of the Joseon Dynasty.

As a means to preserve the legitimacy of Sado's son as his own heir, Yeongjo decreed that the boy be registered as the son of the deceased Crown Prince Hyojang and Crown Princess Consort Hyosun.

Catholicism
Yeongjo was the first to take action against Roman Catholic activities in the country. By the 18th century, Catholicism was beginning to acquire a following especially in the Gangwon and Hwanghae provinces. In 1758, Yeongjo officially outlawed Catholicism as an evil practice.

Death
Fourteen years after Crown Prince Sado's death, his son and Yeongjo's grandson, Yi San (posthumously King Jeongjo), became King. The early part of the new King's years were marked by political intrigues and fear of court officials who were afraid that he would seek revenge on them for petitioning the punishment that caused the death of his father, Crown Prince Sado.

Yeongjo is buried with his second wife, Queen Jeongsun, in the royal tomb of Wonneung (원릉, 元陵) in Guri, Gyeonggi Province.

Family
Father: King Sukjong of Joseon (조선 숙종) (7 October 1661 – 12 July 1720)
Grandfather: King Hyeonjong of Joseon (조선 현종) (14 March 1641 – 17 September 1674)
Grandmother: Queen Myeongseong of the Cheongpung Kim clan (명성왕후 김씨) (13 June 1642 – 21 January 1684)
Biological mother: Royal Noble Consort Suk of the Haeju Choe clan (숙빈 최씨) (17 December 1670 – 9 April 1718)
Grandfather: Choe Hyo-won (최효원) (23 February 1638 – 15 August 1672)
Grandmother: Lady Hong of the Namyang Hong clan (남양 홍씨) (1639 – 1673)
Adoptive mother: Queen Inwon of the Gyeongju Kim clan (인원왕후 김씨) (3 November 1687 – 13 May 1757)
Consorts and their respective issue(s):
 Queen Jeongseong of the Daegu Seo clan (정성왕후 서씨) (12 January 1693 – 3 April 1757) — No issue.
 Queen Jeongsun of the Gyeongju Kim clan (정순왕후 김씨) (2 December 1745 – 11 February 1805) — No issue.
 Royal Noble Consort Jeong of the Hamyang Yi clan (정빈 이씨) (1694 – 16 November 1721)
 Princess Hwaeok (화억옹주) (22 April 1717 – 8 April 1718), first daughter
 Yi Haeng, Crown Prince Hyojang  (효장세자 이행) (4 April 1719 – 16 December 1728), first son
 Princess Hwasun (화순옹주) (8 March 1720 – 17 January 1758), second daughter
 Royal Noble Consort Yeong of the Jeonui Yi clan (영빈 이씨) (15 August 1696 – 23 August 1764)
 Princess Hwapyong (화평옹주) (27 April 1727 – 24 June 1748), third daughter
 Fourth daughter (3 August 1728 – 18 February 1731)
 Fifth daughter (12 December 1729 – 21 March 1731)
 Six daughter (1 January 1732 – 12 April 1736)
 Princess Hwahyeop (화협옹주) (7 March 1733 – 27 November 1752), seventh daughter
 Yi Seon, Crown Prince Sado (사도세자 이선) (13 February 1735 – 12 July 1762), second son
 Princess Hwawan (화완옹주) (9 March 1738 – 17 May 1808), ninth daughter
 Royal Consort Gwi-in of the Pungyang Jo clan (귀인 조씨) (16 October 1707 – 1780)
 Eighth daughter (19 September 1735 – 3 September 1736)
 Princess Hwayu (화유옹주) (29 September 1740 – 21 May 1777), tenth daughter
 Royal Consort Sug-ui of the Nampyeong Moon clan (숙의 문씨) (? – 1776)
 Princess Hwaryeong (화령옹주) (1753 – 1821), eleventh daughter
 Princess Hwagil (화길옹주) (1754 – 1772), twelfth daughter
 Court Lady Yi (상궁 이씨)

Ancestry

In popular culture
Portrayed by Kim Sung-won in the 1988 MBC TV series 500 Years of Joseon: The Memoirs of Lady Hyegyeong.
Portrayed by Park Geun-hyung in the 1998 MBC TV series The King's Road. 
Portrayed by Choi Bool-am in the 1998 MBC TV series Hong Guk Young.
Portrayed by Jo Min-ki in the 2002 MBC TV series Inspector Park Moon So.
Portrayed by Lee Tae-ri in the 2002 KBS TV series Jang Hee Bin.
Portrayed by Kim Sung-gyum in the 2007 CGV TV series Eight Days, Assassination Attempts against King Jeongjo.
Portrayed by Lee Soon-jae in the 2007 MBC TV series Lee San, Wind of the Palace.
Portrayed by Lee Hyung-suk and Lee Seon-ho in the 2010 MBC TV series Dong Yi. 
Portrayed by Jeon Gook-hwan in the 2011 SBS TV series Warrior Baek Dong-soo.
Portrayed by Han Suk-kyu in the 2014 SBS TV series Secret Door.
Portrayed by Song Kang-ho in the 2015 film The Throne.
Portrayed by Yeo Jin-goo in the 2016 SBS TV series The Royal Gambler.
Portrayed by Ryu Tae-joon in the 2017 film The Age of Blood.
Portrayed by Jung Il-woo in the 2019 SBS TV series Haechi.
Portrayed by Lee Deok-hwa in the 2021 MBC TV series The Red Sleeve.

See also
History of Korea
List of monarchs of Korea
Joseon
Dong Yi (TV series)

References

1694 births
1776 deaths
18th-century Korean monarchs
People from Seoul